Notre-Dame-du-Rocher is a commune in the Orne department in north-western France. On 1 January 2016, it was merged into the new commune of Athis-Val-de-Rouvre.

See also
 Communes of the Orne department

References 

Notredamedurocher